Bullseye! is a 1990 British–American action comedy film starring Michael Caine and Roger Moore. It was directed by Michael Winner. It was released on 2 November 1990, to mixed reviews, and was a box office disappointment. It has since developed a small cult following.

Plot
Moore and Caine play dual roles—a pair of small-time con-men and a pair of inept nuclear physicists who believe they have invented a limitless supply of energy. The con men use their resemblance to the scientists to con their way into the scientists' safe deposit boxes and steal the formula, but in so doing, they become entangled in a shady world of spies and international intrigue. The film includes a number of cameo appearances, including Jenny Seagrove (Winner's partner at the time) playing two different roles, John Cleese, Patsy Kensit, Alexandra Pigg and Nicholas Courtney. The film also features Roger Moore's daughter, Deborah Moore, in a supporting role.

Cast
Michael Caine – Sidney Lipton / Dr Daniel Hicklar
Roger Moore – Gerald Bradley-Smith / Sir John Bavistock
Sally Kirkland – Willie
Lee Patterson – Darrell Hyde
Deborah Moore – Flo Fleming (as Deborah Barrymore)
Mark Burns – Nigel Holden
Derren Nesbitt – Inspector Grosse
Deborah Leng – Francesca
Christopher Adamson – Death's Head
Steffanie Pitt – Donna Dutch
Angus MacKay – Reverend Simkin
Nicholas Courtney – Sir Hugh
Robert McBain – Lawyer
John Woodnutt – Bank Manager
Mildred Shay – Jolene (Tourist Wife)
Helen Horton – Tourist on Coach
Jeff Harding – Agent Merrow
Gordon Honeycombe – TV Announcer
Pamela Armstrong – TV Newsreader
Kiran Shah – Little Boss at Auction
John Cleese – Man on the Beach in Barbados Who Looks Like John Cleese
Jenny Seagrove – Health Club Receptionist / Girl with John Cleese
Patsy Kensit – Sick Lady on Train
Alexandra Pigg – Car Hire Girl
Deborah Bishop – Mr Moore's left eyebrow
Jim Bowen – Himself
Tony Green – Himself
Cliff Lazarenko - Celebrity Dart Thrower
John Scott Martin – Old Jeweller
John Lyons – Train Guard

Reception
The Radio Times Guide to Films''' review of Bullseye!'' states: "this appallingly unfunny comedy is a career low for all concerned".

Release and home video
This film has been released on several countries theatrically and later on VHS by RCA/Columbia Pictures Home Video. The film is available on the made-on-demand DVD-R service from MGM Home Entertainment through 20th Century Fox.

References

External links

1990 films
Films directed by Michael Winner
Films scored by John Du Prez
1990 action comedy films
British action comedy films
Films with screenplays by Michael Winner
Films about con artists
Films about physics
Films about lookalikes
Films produced by Michael Winner
Films produced by Menahem Golan
1990s English-language films
1990s British films